Redlands is an electoral ward of the Borough of Reading, in the English county of Berkshire. It is situated to the south-east of the town centre, and is bordered by Abbey, Park, Church and Katesgrove wards.

As with all wards, apart from smaller Mapledurham, it elects three councillors to Reading Borough Council.  Elections since 2004 are held by thirds, with elections in three years out of four.

Between 2010 and 2018 a Labour Party or Labour and Co-operative Party candidate won every election, namely in 2011, 2012, 2014, 2015, 2016 and 2018.  In 2019 Green Party (UK) candidate won the seat of Jan Gavin (Lab) who stood down.

These Councillors are currently, in order of election: David McElroy (Green), Jamie Whitham (Green) and David Absolom (Lab).

References

Wards of Reading